Rodney Perry (born September 15, 1970 in Chicago, Illinois) is an American comedian, actor and writer. He is most known for serving as co-host on BET's late night talk show The Mo'Nique Show where he provided laughs alongside actress and comedian Mo'Nique five nights a week from October 5, 2009 until the show ended on August 16, 2011.

Early life 
Born in Chicago, Illinois and raised in Monroe, Louisiana, Perry found his way to comedy by way of the United States Navy, where he performed to some of his toughest audiences. He eventually moved to the Bay Area where he honed his comedic craft and perfected his stage show, which includes observations on everything from the workplace to the joys and occasional pains of raising a big family.

Career 
For four seasons, Perry has served as co-host and Man on the Street for TV One's comedy competition Bill Bellamy's Who's Got Jokes? He's also appeared on HBO's Def Comedy Jam, BET's Comic View, Showtime's Jamie Foxx's Laffapalooza, Starz Network's Martin Lawrence Presents First Amendment Stand-Up, E! Network's Chelsea Lately and Byron Allen's Comics Unleashed. On the big screen, Perry joined Tyler Perry and a host of stars in Tyler Perry's 2011 film Tyler Perry's Madea's Big Happy Family. Perry has also teamed up with Tony Rock in the film The Last Laugh, a drama about comedy.  In addition to his nightly role on The Mo'Nique Show, Perry constantly tours with his stand-up act.  He is currently preparing to shoot his first comedy special, Rodney Perry All the Way Live, in summer 2011.

Filmography

Film/Movie

Television

Comedy Special

References

External links 
 Rodney Perry Official Website
 Rodney Perry Official Twitter
 Rodney Perry Official Facebook Page

1970 births
Living people
African-American male comedians
American male comedians
American male film actors
African-American television personalities
Male actors from Chicago
People from Monroe, Louisiana
African-American male actors
Comedians from Illinois
21st-century American comedians
Comedians from Louisiana
21st-century African-American people
20th-century African-American people